90.9 Brigada News FM (DYMM 90.9 MHz) is an FM station owned and operated by Brigada Mass Media Corporation. Its studios and transmitter are located at J. Lequin St., Bogo, Cebu.

References

External links
Brigada News FM Bogo FB Page

Radio stations in Cebu
Radio stations established in 2015